Mroz or Mróz is a surname. Cognate to Maroz, Moroz and Mraz, it means "frost" in Polish. It is most frequent in southern and eastern Poland.

People 
 Brandon Mroz (born 1990), American figure skater
 Daniel Mróz (1917–1993), Polish stage designer and artist
 John Edwin Mroz (1948–2014), American foreign policy writer
 Paul Mross (1919–1991), Polish–German chess master
 Paweł Mróz (born 1984), Polish bobsleader
 Vincent Mroz (1922–2008), American Secret Service agent

See also
 
 Mróz (cycling team), a professional cycling team

References 

Polish-language surnames